Sir Thomas John Pittar, KCB, CMG (29 October 1846 – 20 July 1924) was an English civil servant. He spent his whole career at HM Customs, becoming a Commissioner of Customs in 1900 and then serving as Chairman of the Board of Customs from 1903 to 1908. He represented Britain at the Brussels Sugar Conference in 1901 and 1902 and at the Brussels Permanent Commission in 1903.

References 

1846 births
1924 deaths
English civil servants
Knights Companion of the Order of the Bath
Companions of the Order of St Michael and St George